Bandon may refer to:

Places
 Hundred of Bandon, a cadastral unit in South Australia
 Bandon (UK Parliament constituency), a former constituency (1801–1885) in Ireland
 Bandon, County Cork, Ireland
 River Bandon, in Ireland
 Bandon Bay, a bay in the Gulf of Thailand
 Bandon district or Mueang Surat Thani district, an administrative district in Surat Thani province, Thailand
 Bandon, Indiana, United States
 Bandon, Oregon, United States

Other uses
 Earl of Bandon, a title in the Peerage of Ireland
 Bandon (Byzantine Empire), a Byzantine military and administrative unit